Statistics of Swedish football Division 3 for the 1955–56 season.

League standings

Norra Norrland 1955–56

Mellersta Norrland 1955–56

Södra Norrland 1955–56

Norra Svealand 1955–56

Östra Svealand 1955–56

Västra Svealand 1955–56

Nordöstra Götaland 1955–56

Nordvästra Götaland 1955–56

Mellersta Götaland 1955–56

Sydöstra Götaland 1955–56

Sydvästra Götaland 1955–56

Södra Götaland 1955–56

Footnotes

References 

Swedish Football Division 3 seasons
3
Swed